Minde ( in Minderico) is a town and  (civil parish) of Alcanena Municipality, in the District of Santarém, in Portugal. The population of the entire civil parish in 2011 was 3,293, in an area of 21.14 km² (Censos 2011). Minde is known as the place of origin of the Minderico, a sociolect or argot spoken by traders. The civil parish is located in a landscape of intensive karst. People who originate from or live in Minde are informally known as Minderico (said to have been created as a variation of Mindense (which is also correct) because, as a result of the regional development of the clothing industry, the people of Minde were considered to be wealthy (rico in Portuguese, thus Minderico). The formal and ever-used form of Minderico is Mindense.

Geography
Minde is located in a landscape of intensive karst in an area of central mainland Portugal. It was part of the historical province Ribatejo. The town proper borders a karst basin. In the summer the polje is fertile fields, in winter, in case of heavy rain, a temporary lake. Minde is part of the Médio Tejo region in central Portugal.

Climate

History
Minde was first mentioned in official records in the year 1165, in a letter written by Afonso I of Portugal, where he established  a hostel in what is now modern-day Minde.  

In 1892, Minde became part of the Torres Novas município, leaving Porto de Mós. In 1914, the Alcanena município is founded, and, since then, Minde is part of it.

Notable people
Adelaide Ferreira (born 1 January 1959 in Minde, Alcanena), a Portuguese singer.
Alfredo Roque Gameiro (4 April 1864, Minde - 15 August 1935, Lisbon), a Portuguese painter and graphic artist who specialized in watercolors.
Isaac Achega (drummer)
Tiago Guedes, a Portuguese citizen and French knight and artist
Mila Ferreira, a Portuguese singer and model

Gallery

References

Freguesias of Alcanena